This is a list of electoral results for the electoral district of West Swan in Western Australian state elections.

Members for West Swan

Election results

Elections in the 2020s

Elections in the 2010s

Elections in the 2000s

References

Western Australian state electoral results by district